Porbandar State Railway was a  metre gauge  in the Porbandar State in Gujarat during the 19th century.

History
The Porbandar State Railway was owned by the State of Porbandar, which was then ruled by Vikramatji Khimojiraj. Later railways were further developed by Bhavsinhji Madhavsinhji and Natwarsinhji Bhavsinhji under their rules. It worked initially with Bhavnagar–Gondal–Junagad–Porbandar Railway until 1911. It was opened to traffic in 1888. Later, from 1919, it worked with Gondal Railway. The Porbandar rail line was extended to Jamjodhpur in 1922, at which time the line was 42 miles long. After that it merged with Saurashtra Railway in April 1948.

Classification
It was labeled as a Class III railway according to Indian Railway Classification System of 1926.

Conversion to broad gauge 
The railway lines were converted to  broad gauge in 2011.

References

Transport in Porbandar
Metre gauge railways in India
Defunct railway companies of India
History of rail transport in Gujarat